is a city located in Aomori Prefecture, Japan. , the city had an estimated population of 30,128 in 13487 households, and a population density of 120 persons per km². The city's name is atypical for a Japanese place, in that it is written in hiragana rather than kanji (see hiragana cities).

Geography
Tsugaru is located on the west coast of Tsugaru Peninsula, facing the Sea of Japan. The Iwaki River flows through the city. Parts of the city are within the borders of Tsugaru Quasi-National Park.

Neighbouring municipalities 
Aomori Prefecture
Hirosaki
Goshogawara
Ajigasawa
Tsuruta
Nakadomari

Climate
The city has a cold humid continental climate (Köppen Dfb) characterized by warm short summers and long cold winters with heavy snowfall. The average annual temperature in Tsugaru is 10.6 °C. The average annual rainfall is 1298 mm with September as the wettest month. The temperatures are highest on average in August, at around 23.9 °C, and lowest in January, at around -1.3 °C.

Demographics
Per Japanese census data, the population of Tsugaru has decreased steadily over the past 60 years.

History
The area of Tsugaru was part of the holdings of the Tsugaru clan of Hirosaki Domain in the Edo period. After the Meiji restoration, the area was organised into Nishitsugaru District, Aomori. With the post-Meiji restoration establishment of the modern municipalities system on April 1, 1889, the area became part of Nishitsugaru District, Aomori on April 1, 1889. The village of Kizukuri was raised to town status on May 1, 1901. Kizuki expanded by merging with the neighboring villages of Koshimizu, Shibata, Kawayoke, Shussei, Tateoka and part of Narusawa on March 30, 1955.

The city of Tsugaru was established on February 11, 2005, from the merger of the town of Kizukuri, and the villages of Inagaki, Kashiwa, Morita and Shariki (all from Nishitsugaru District).

Government
Tsugaru has a mayor-council form of government with a directly elected mayor and a unicameral city legislature of 20 members. Tsugaru contributes one member to the Aomori Prefectural Assembly. In terms of national politics, the city is part of Aomori 3rd district of the lower house of the Diet of Japan.

Economy
The economy of Tsugaru is heavily dependent on agriculture and commercial fishing. The city serves as a minor regional commercial center. Agricultural produce includes rice, apples, melons, watermelons, and Brasenia.

Education
Tsugaru has seven public elementary schools and five public junior high schools which is operated by the city government, and one public high school operated by the Aomori Prefectural Board of Education. The prefecture also operates one special education school for the handicapped.

Transport

Railway
 East Japan Railway Company (JR East) - Gonō Line
  -  -  -

Highway
 Tsugaru Expressway

Local Attractions
Takayama Inari Shrine
Kamegaoka Stone Age Site, a National Historic Site  
Tagoyano Shell Mound, a National Historic Site  
Lake Jūsan

Sister city relations
 – Bath, Maine, United States – Friendship City from 2006
 – Kashiwa, Chiba, Japan – from 1994
 – Shiraoi, Hokkaido, Japan – from 2005

Noted people from Tsugaru
Rio Matsumoto, actress
Nitta Hachirō, singer of popular and classical music
Shunkichi Takeuchi, politician, former Aomori governor
Gento Uehara, songwriter
Kenroku Uehara, songwriter

The town has produced many top sumo wrestlers over the years. Among them are:
Wakanohana Kanji I,  yokozuna
Takanosato Toshihide, yokozuna
Asahifuji Seiya, yokozuna
Wakanosato Shinobu,  sekiwake

References

External links 

  

 
Cities in Aomori Prefecture
Populated coastal places in Japan
2005 establishments in Japan